Toyo (臺與/台与), also known as Iyo (壹與/壱与), (235-?) was a queen regnant of Yamatai-koku in Japan. She was, according to the "Records of Wei" and other traditional sources, the successor of Queen Himiko.
Wajinden

Reign 
Iyo is not cited in many historical records, and her origin is unknown. The only recorded reliable claims are that Iyo was a close relative of Himiko, and that she acquired great political power at a very young age. Information obtained from Chinese sources and from archeological and ethnological discoveries has led Japanese scholars to conclude that Iyo was Himiko's niece. Himiko and Iyo were female shamans and that sovereignty had both a political and a religious character.

After Himiko's death, a man took power in Yamatai as regent. However, warfare soon engulfed the polity. The ruling council met and decided to put another woman on the throne. The one chosen was Iyo, a girl only 13 years old, who succeeded in reinstating peace in her government by following the same political line adopted by Queen Himiko.

The Records of Wei describes Himiko's death and Iyo's rise in the following terms:When Himiko passed away, a great mound was raised, more than a hundred paces in diameter. Over a hundred male and female attendants followed her to the grave. Then a king was placed on the throne, but the people would not obey him. Assassination and murder followed; more than one thousand were thus slain. A relative of Himiko named Iyo [壹與], a girl of thirteen, was [then] made queen and order was restored. (Zhang) Zheng (張政) (an ambassador from Wei), issued a proclamation to the effect that Iyo was the ruler. (tr. Tsunoda 1951:16)Iyo continued, or restored, tributary relations between Wa and Wei; Wei officials were included among her advisors, and she sent an embassy of twenty individuals, led by her grand steward Isako, to accompany some of these Chinese officials back to China.

In popular culture
Appears as the titular character in the novel series Matsura Iyohime (まつら伊世姫) by Junji Hasegawa (1991)
Appears in the novel Kishin (kishin -姫神-) by Shinji Sadakane (2001)
Appears in manga series Raika (雷火), story by Yū Terashima, art by Kamui Fujiwara (1987-1997)
Appears as a main character in the manga series Yamato Gensōki (邪馬台幻想記) by Kentaro Yabuki (1999)
Appears in the manga series Ao no Jidai (青青の時代) by Ryoko Yamagishi (1998-2000)
Appears in the mobile game Fate/Grand Order as a Ruler-class Servant voiced by Ari Ozawa, developed by Lasengle and published by Aniplex (2022)

References

 Aston, William G, tr. 1924. Nihongi: Chronicles of Japan from the Earliest Times to CE 697. 2 vols. Charles E Tuttle reprint 1972.
 Chamberlain, Basil Hall, tr. 1919. The Kojiki, Records of Ancient Matters. Charles E Tuttle reprint 2005.
 .
 .
 .
 .
 Hideyuki, Shindoa.「卑弥呼の殺人」角川春樹事務所, 2005.
 Hori, Ichiro. 1968. Folk Religion in Japan: Continuity and Change. University of Chicago Press.
 Imamura. Keiji. 1996. Prehistoric Japan: New Perspectives on Insular East Asia. University of Hawai’i Press.
 Kidder, Jonathan Edward. 2007. Himiko and Japan’s Elusive Chiefdom of Yamatai. University of Hawai’i Press.
 .
 .
 
 .

Japanese women in warfare
Women rulers in Japan
3rd-century deaths
3rd-century women rulers
235 births
Aristocracy of ancient Japan
Queens regnant in Asia
People of Yayoi-period Japan
Yamatai
Ancient Japanese priestesses